Sabal yapa is a species of palm. It grows in Belize, Guatemala, western Cuba, and the Yucatan Peninsula region of Mexico (Yucatán, Campeche, Quintana Roo). It prefers limestone-based calcareous soils. It is often described as a palmetto palm as it has costapalmate fronds, which are like a transition phase between fan palms and feather-leaved palms.

References

yapa
Plants described in 1907
Flora of Belize
Flora of Campeche
Flora of Cuba
Flora of Quintana Roo
Flora of Yucatán
Flora of Guatemala
Flora of Mexico
Taxa named by Odoardo Beccari
Flora without expected TNC conservation status